Charlie Chauhan is an Indian actress and lyricist known for playing the role of Ela in the teen drama Best Friends Forever? and Mukti Vardhan in  Kaisi Yeh Yaariyan.

Career
Charlie Played the lead role in the show Best Friends Forever?. She also participated in the reality dance show Nach Baliye 5 with Kunwar Amar. She portrayed the character of Mukti Vardhan in MTV popular youth show Kaisi Yeh Yaariyan, and she has also been part of the Music album Beparwaahiyaan.

Filmography

Television

Film

See also
 List of Indian television actresses

References

External links 

 

Living people
1995 births
Indian television actresses
People from Shimla
Actresses from Himachal Pradesh
Indian soap opera actresses
Indian film actresses
Indian women television presenters
Actresses in Hindi television
21st-century Indian actresses
Violence against women in India